Kensington Communications is a Toronto-based production company that specializes in documentary films and documentary/factual television series. Founded in 1980 by president Robert Lang, Kensington Communications Inc. has produced over 250 productions from documentary series and films to performing arts and children's specials. Since 1998, Kensington has also been involved in multi-platform interactive projects for the web and mobile devices.

The company's recent productions include two one-hour science documentaries: Why We Dance, a bold exploration of dance as an emergent phenomenon in evolution and Nature's Cleanup Crew, about the busy urban scavengers who clean up the mountains of waste humans leave behind, both for CBC's The Nature of Things and Arte; The Shadow of Gold for TVO, Arte France and SVT, co-produced with Films å Çinq and CAPA in Paris, a feature documentary world-wide examination of the gold industry from raw material to market; The Equalizer and Champions vs. Legends, two one-hour international co-productions which examine improvements in high performance sports technologies for CBC Nature of Things, ZDF, Arte; Risk Factor, a one-hour POV documentary that demystifies personal and societal risk; Museum Secrets, a television series that explores museums across the globe; and Shameless Idealists, a five-part series that features interviews with changemakers and social activists like Richard Branson, Magic Johnson, and Nelly Furtado. Kensington has won a number of awards for these and other programs (see Awards section for details). Among Kensington's recent interactive projects are: the mobile app, Risk Navigator, which personalizes the users' risk reward balance; Scopify, a mobile app which allows visitors to the Royal Ontario Museum to get an augmented experience of some of the museum's artifacts; and Museum Secrets Interactive, with web videos, games and information.

Filmography

Television Series
Museum Secrets (History TV, UKTV, Historia, BBC) - A 22-episode series that goes into museums all over the world (e.g. the Louvre, the American Museum of Natural History, the Vatican) and looks at the stories behind the museums' artifacts. Awarded Best Factual Series at the 2014 Canadian Screen Awards.
Shameless Idealists (CTV) - a five-part series that profiles celebrity changemakers and social activists. Produced in collaboration with Free the Children
Diamond Road, 3-part documentary series produced for TVOntario, History Television, Discovery Times, ZDF, Arte and Special Broadcasting Service Australia; awarded best documentary series, Gemini Award.
City Sonic (co-produced with White Pine Pictures), 4 x 30 minutes and 20 5-minute episodes, 2009 
72 Hours: True Crime, 3 seasons from 2005-2007 (CBC/TLC).
Exhibit A: Secrets of Forensic Science, 5 seasons from 1997-2003 (Discovery/CTV/TLC).
The Sacred Balance (CBC/PBS), with broadcaster-environmentalist David Suzuki which is also accompanied by an interactive media site, Sacred Balance.com; awarded best science environment program, Houston Worldfest, Yorkton Short Film festival and many others.

One-off Documentaries:
Why We Dance (CBC, ARTV, Explora, SWR and Arte)
Nature's Cleanup Crew (CBC, ZDF, Arte)
The Shadow of Gold (TVO, Canal D, Arte France, SVT) - co-production with Films à Cinq, Paris
Champions vs. Legends (CBC, SRC, Arte, ARD, ORF) - co-production with Berlin Producers (Germany) and PreTV (Austria)
Risk Factor (TVO, Canal D, Knowledge Network)
The Equalizer (CBC, SRC, Arte, ZDF) - co-production with Berlin Producers
Raw Opium: Pain, Pleasure, Profits (TVO, ZDF Arte, Canal D, SBS)
Return to Nepal with Bruce Cockburn (documentary channel)
Almost Home: A Sayisi Dene Journey (CBC); awarded best Social Political documentary and Kathleen Shannon Award at Yorkton Film Festival.
My Beat: The Life and Times of Bruce Cockburn (CBC)
River of Sand (TVO/Vision); awarded best Canadian film at Vues d'Afrique film festival
Separate Lives (Discovery/TLC/BBC), awarded best science, environment or nature documentary, Gemini Award
A Place in the World (Vision/SCN); awarded Vision Humanitarian Award, Hot Docs
Mariposa: Under a Stormy Sky—an examination of 1960s folk music and the Mariposa Folk Festival (CTV)
One Warm Line—a portrait of the legendary Canadian folk singer, Stan Rogers (CBC)
Pacific Rim: A Park and its People (Discovery Channel's Parks Series)
On the Run: Growing up with Alcohol; Awarded Best Film from the National Foundation for Alcoholism Communications Awards
Out of the Past (TVOntario, PBS, Access Alberta)
Stepdancing: Portrait of a Remarried Family (CBC); Awarded 1987 Blue Ribbon in the American Film and Video Festival
Seeds
Fragile Harvest(CBC's The Nature of Things, NFB)
Joe David/Spirit of the Mask half-hour documentary for CBC)
Childhood's End (for TVO)

Interactive & Digital Projects:
Risk Navigator - A popular and useful app that helps you make informed decisions about all the risks in your life.
Scopify - An augmented reality mobile app that allows museum visitors to interact with artifacts.
Raw Opium Online
Museum Secrets Interactive, a rich-media website for the series Museum Secrets.
City Sonic, a multi platform music documentary series (Gemini-nominated).
Diamond Road Online
SacredBalance.com
River of Sand Interactive

Children's Variety Programming
Biggest Little Ticket (CTV/YTV)

Public Service Media
50 Television Public Service Announcements for USC Canada
Public Service Announcement for Climate Action Network
Moving the Banyan Tree, half hour documentary (for USC Canada and CIDA)
Path to Nepal with Bruce Cockburn (for USC Canada)

Recognitions

Awards
2016/17 Remi Platinum Award, Best Sports Documentary, The Equalizer (Houston International Film Festival)
 Finalist, Sports Documentary, The Equalizer, International Sport Film Festival Palermo
 Nominated, Best Sports Program, Canadian Screen Awards, 2016
2014
 Canadian Screen Award, Best Factual Series, Museum Secrets (Academy of Canadian Cinema and Television) 
 Canadian Screen Award, Best Picture Editing in an Information Program or Series, Museum Secrets (Academy of Canadian Cinema and Television) 
2013 Canadian Screen Award, Best Sound in an Information/Documentary Program or Series, Museum Secrets (Academy of Canadian Cinema and Television)
 Digi Awards, (Nomination) Best in Mobility, ScopifyROM
2008 Canadian New Media Awards, Best News Information, Diamond Road Online
 Gemini Award – Best Documentary Series, Diamond Road
 Platinum Award – Best Feature Documentary, Diamond Road (Houston Worldfest)
2005 & 2007 Worldmedal – Docudrama, 72 Hours: True Crime (New York Festivals)
2004 Golden Sheaf Award – Best Documentary, Social/Political Almost Home (Yorkton Festival)
2004 NFB Kathleen Shannon Award, Almost Home (Yorkton Short Film & Video Festival)
2004 Platinum Award – Ecology/Environment/Conservation, Sacred Balance Show 3 Fire of Creation (Houston Worldfest)
1998 Gemini Award – Science, Technology, Nature, Separate Lives (Academy of Canadian Cinema and Television)
1997 HotDocs – Vision TV Humanitarian Award, A Place in the World 
1995 Award of Excellence – Best Variety, The Biggest Little Ticket (Alliance for Children and Television)

Other notable nominations and selections

Notable recognitions include:
 Gemini Awards, BANFF, HistoryMakers, DOXA, ReFrame Festival, Himalayas Film Festival, Planet in Focus, International Documentary Festival of Amsterdam, Prix Science & Societé, Paris

References

External links
Kensington Communications Inc.official site
Kensington on the Internet Movie Database
Official Museum Secrets website
Raw Opium Official Site

Film production companies of Canada
Television production companies of Canada
Companies based in Toronto
Documentary film production companies